Lingqiu County is a county under the administration of Datong City, in the northeast of Shanxi Province, China, bordering Hebei province to the east.

History
Under the Han, Lingqiu County was part of Dai Prefecture. In 1626, the county suffered a magnitude 7.0 earthquake with the loss of more than 5,200 lives.

Climate

References

www.xzqh.org 

County-level divisions of Shanxi
Datong